Saulovo is a rural locality (a village) in Sergeikhinskoye Rural Settlement, Kameshkovsky District, Vladimir Oblast, Russia. The population was 29 as of 2010.

Geography 
Saulovo is located 16 km northwest of Kameshkovo (the district's administrative centre) by road. Ryakhovo is the nearest rural locality.

References 

Rural localities in Kameshkovsky District